Göloba may refer to the following villages in Turkey:

 Göloba, Balya
 Göloba, Bayburt